Ilavida or  Idavida (also known as Devavarnini) is a character in the Ramayana, as the stepmother of Ravana and the first wife of Vishrava. Vishrava was the son of Pulastya and the grandson of Brahma, the Creator.

Daughter of the Rishi Bharadwaja and sister of the Rishi Garga, Ilavida was given in marriage to the Rishi Vishrava and bore him a son, Kubera who would eventually become the king of Lanka.

According to the Bhagavata Purana, she is the daughter of King Trnabindu, a descendant of Vaivasvata Manu and Alambusa. Her siblings include, Visala, Dhumraketu and Sunyabandhu.

Vishrava left Ilavida after meeting, and falling in love with, the Asura Princess, Kaikesi, daughter of King Sumali and Queen Ketumati. Through Kaikesi, Vishrava, fathered Ravana and Kumbhakarna.

When Ravana invaded Lanka and usurped his older brother Kubera's throne, a disgusted Vishrava left his demonic family and returned to Ilavida, never to see Kaikesi or her offspring ever again. Kubera fled to Devaloka (Heaven) where he was charged by Indra, the King of Devas, to manage his treasury. Kubera is best known to Hindus, therefore, not as the erstwhile King of Lanka, but as the God of Wealth.

Citations and notes 

Characters in the Ramayana